Larrimah is a town and a locality in the Northern Territory of Australia located about  southeast of the territorial capital of Darwin and about  southeast of the municipal seat of Katherine. The specific geographical location is -15 35' 00'', 133 12' 00'".

It is built along the Stuart Highway. It was the railhead of the North Australia Railway during World War II.

Demographics
According to the 2016 Australian Census, Larrimah had a population of 47 people - 48.8% male and 51.2% female, with a median age of 41 years. This was a signifiant increase from reported population of 12 in 1976. There are 24 private dwellings, with an average of 2.1 people per household and a median weekly income of $725.00. Since Paddy Moriarty disappeared in December 2017, the local number has shrunk further. In early 2022, however, a baby was born in Larrimah to Czech Republic parents, significantly lowering the town's average age and increasing the population of the town by approximately ten percent.

History 
Before Larrimah was established, the Yangman people occupied the surrounding area for over 40,000 years. They believe the Dreaming tracks of the Storm Bird created the landscape of Larrimah. The name "Larrimah" means "meeting place" in the Yangman language.

Later. John McDouall Stuart explored the Larrimah area in the 1860s on his transcontinental journey from Flinders Range however he didn't settle or establish a town.

Larrimah was officially established in 1940 as the rail terminus of the North Australia Railway Line from Darwin. Larrimah became a military town and the transfer point for army personnel and supplies. In 1942, a repeater station was built from two Sydney Williams huts to provide direct communications with other sites including at Tennant Creek and Newcastle Waters.

World War II 
Darwin was bombed on 19 February 1942 by 175 Japanese planes. This promoted a fear of Japanese invasion of Australia. By March the same year, demand for manpower to meet the invasion threat became significant and in order to fill numbers, the army relaxed its attitude to the enlistment of Aboriginal people. Consequently, Aboriginal people enlisted in large numbers.

The Northern Territory employed more Aboriginal army labourers than other establishments. By 1944, the army employed one-fifth of Aboriginal people in the Northern Territory. In May 1943, Larrimah employed 497 Aboriginal men and 33 women. Men carried out semi-skilled work including slaughtering, timber cutting and cleaning. Women performed maintenance tasks and were employed in hospitals, similar to work by Australian Women’s Army Service.

These "special settlements" established from Larrimah to Darwin became meeting grounds for Aboriginal people from Alice Springs, Victoria River and the Arnhem Land. The diverse groups of Aboriginal people shared work and duties with each other and played cards together, emphasising their status as part of the wider army system.

North Australia Railway 
The North Australia Railway was officially opened in October 1889 was a gauge railway from Darwin to Birdum extending 234 km. During World War II, the railhead of this line became Larrimah. It became the site of an army transit camp. The railway transported troops and materials to and from the northern Australia war zone. It also was a vital link with Darwin for those living in remote communities as communication between Birdum and Alice Springs was only available via the Stuart Highway.

In the 1960s and 1970s, the railway was important due to iron ore needing to be transported from Frances Creek Deposits. During its peak, one million tonnes per anumn were transported. When global prices dropped, the mine was forced to close, and traffic from other industries could not financially keep the line open. The railway officially ceased all operations and closed in February 1981.

Gorrie Airfield 
Gorrie Airfield was established at the end of the North Australia Railway line, 10 km from the Larrimah town centre. During World War II, it was the largest army base in Australia. The airstrip was named after F/OP Peter C Gorrie who was killed in action on 12 January 1942 in the Dutch East Indies.

During World War II, Gorrie Airfield was the base for Royal Australian Air Force and United States Air Force personnel. During 1943, it was home to 6,500 military recruits, making it one of the largest military bases in the Pacific Region during World War II.

A large bomb dump, petrol storage and other bulk supply storage was constructed in the area for the warehousing of stores prior to issue to other units.

All personnel left Gorrie Airfield for Darwin during October 1945 after peace was declared on 15 August 1945. All remaining machinery and equipment was sent to the army base in Pearce Western Australia.

Heritage
The following places listed on the Northern Territory Heritage Register are located within the locality of Larrimah:

Birdum Historic Township 
Established in 1929 at the terminus of the North Australia Railway. A small township developed including a Hotel, Post Office, railway infrastructure and a number of shops.

The township was the southernmost point reached by the railway and became an important transport hub for Territory road, rail and air transport in the 1930s. It was the only location to serve all three functions.

Birdum township was briefly the headquarter location for the American Air Force before moving closer to Larrimah.

Structural remains at the site show the lives of a small community pre and post World War II and has social associations with both American and Australian forces during the war.

WWII Larrimah Telephone Repeater Station and Powerhouse 
Built in 1941and 1942, the Telephone Repeater Station and Powerhouse, relocated in 1946 were a result of the military's urgent upgrading of existing Mose Code overland telegraph line to a direct voice system.

The Repeater Station had state of the art long line repeater system, consisting of four voice frequency and carrier channels. The technology became obsolete in the 1970s.

The Powerhouse provided operational electricity for the telecommunications system and to keep bank batteries fully charged.

Both buildings represent significant a significant era in change of telecommunication and demonstrate characteristics of military commissioned architecture.

Pop culture 
Larrimah was visited in an episode of Dom Joly's Happy Hour.

The Disappearance of Paddy Moriarty 
Paddy Moriarty was born in Ireland in 1947. It is believed he was conceived out of wedlock and was a foster child. He immigrated to Australia at 18 and worked as a station hand, ringer and grader driver. After moving to Larrimah in 2008, he purchased an unused service station in 2010 for $30,000.

On 16 December 2017, Paddy Moriarty and his dog Kellie left the Pink Panther, Larrimah’s local pub and drove 800 m home via quadbike. It is believed Paddy and Kellie arrived at home as "Paddy’s hat, wallet and keys were on the table, next to dinner- ready to be heated up… Kellie’s food was half eaten in a dog bowl".

On 17 December 2017 when Moriarty did not reappear the next day, locals suspected something had happened. However, there were several days delay in reporting him missing to the nearest police station, 70 km away. Despite extensive air and land searches, and a $250,000 reward for information, Moriarty and Kellie have not been seen or found since.

On 7 April 2022, coroner Greg Cavanagh handed down inquest findings on Moriarty and his dog’s suspected deaths. The coroner concluded Moriarty was likely killed on 16 December 2017, however his cause of death was unable to be determined. Cavanagh established Moriarty was "killed in the context of and likely due to the ongoing feud he had with his nearest neighbours".

Northern Territory Legislation does not allow coroner Greg Cavanagh to include a finding or comment that a person may be guilty- "However, I will refer this investigation to the Commissioner of Police and the DPP", he said.

Investigations into the suspected death of Paddy Moriarty and his dog Kellie continue, and the $250,000 reward for information remains open.

The Walkley Award winning Australian crime podcast Lost in Larrimah, released in April–May 2018, explored the mystery of Moriarty's disappearance, as well as the town's history in great depth, including the feuds within the small community. The hosts, Kylie Stevenson and Caroline Graham, released a book named after the town in 2021. Larrimah: A missing man, an eyeless croc and an outback town of 1̶2̶ 11 people who mostly hate each other covers both the town's history and the disappearance of Paddy Moriarty. The disappearance was also the subject of a four part Radio National series by ABC News called A Dog Act: Homicide on the Highway, released in December 2018.

References

Towns in the Northern Territory